Seleh Chin-e Sofla (also Romanized as Seleh Chīn-e Soflá; also known as Deh Sanjā, Deh Sanjāb, and Selechīn) is a village in Jannat Makan Rural District, in the Central District of Gotvand County, Khuzestan Province, Iran. At the 2006 census, its population was 582, in 111 families.

References 

Populated places in Gotvand County